Kārikā (कारिका) is a genre of Sanskrit literature. "Kārikā" also refers to any metrical verse or line which explains, in an aphoristic manner, some key idea (usually philosophical). There are Hindu and Buddhist examples of the genre.

Some important Kārikās include:

 Sāṁkhyakārikā, the earliest work of the Hindu Sāṁkhya school of philosophy
 Nāgārjuna's Mūlamadhyamakakārikā (Root Verses on Madhyamaka)
 Gaudapada's Māṇḍukya Kārikā (on the Māṇḍukya Upanishad)
 Bhavaviveka's Madhyamakahṛdayakārikā (Verses on the Heart of Madhyamaka)
 Kallata's Spandakārikā, a Kashmiri Shaiva work
 Īśvarapratyabhijñākārikā of Utpaladeva

Sanskrit